The Stadtarchiv Stralsund (City Archives of Stralsund) is the historical Archive of the Hanseatic City of Stralsund and an important municipal archive in Mecklenburg-Vorpommern. 

The Stadtarchiv Stralsund ranks among the important communal archives in Europe, as it covers the city's role in the Hanseatic League and the history of Swedish Pomerania. This municipal archive has been taking custody of records in Stralsund since the Middle Ages.

The study facilities for the archives are in the Johanniskloster (St. John's Monastery).

References 
Herbert Ewe. Schätze einer Ostseestadt. Herrmann Böhlaus Nachf., Weimar 1980
Herbert Ewe. Stralsunder Bilderhandschrift – Historische Ansichten vorpommerscher Städte. Hinstorff-Verlag, Rostock 1979
Herbert Ewe. Schätze einer Ostseestadt: 7 Jh. im Stralsunder Archiv, Böhlau, 1975 (German and English)

External links 

 Stadtarchiv Stralsund www.stralsund.de

Archives in Germany
Stralsund
Culture of Mecklenburg-Western Pomerania
Heritage sites in Mecklenburg-Western Pomerania
Libraries in Germany
City archives